The Clannad animated television series is based on the visual novel Clannad by the Japanese visual novel brand Key. The episodes, produced by the animation studio Kyoto Animation, are directed by Tatsuya Ishihara, written by Fumihiko Shimo, and features character design by Kazumi Ikeda who based the designs on Itaru Hinoue's original concept. The story follows the main character Tomoya Okazaki, a discontented high school student whose life changes when he meets a girl one year older than he is, named Nagisa Furukawa.

The Clannad anime series has 24 episodes, 23 of which were originally broadcast between October 2007 and March 2008. The last episode was released as an original video animation (OVA) on the eighth DVD in July 2008. The anime series was released in a set of eight DVD compilations in Japan released between December 2007 and July 2008 by Pony Canyon, with each compilation containing three episodes. The license holding company Sentai Filmworks licensed the Clannad anime series, and Section23 Films localized and distributed the television series and the OVA starting with the first half season box set consisting of 12 episodes with English subtitles, Japanese audio, and no English language track, which was released in March 2009. The second half season box set containing the remaining episodes was released in May 2009. Sentai Filmworks and Section23 Films released the entire first season, including the OVA, in a complete collection set featuring an English dub on June 15, 2010.

A continuation of the first anime series titled Clannad After Story produced by the same staff as with the first series, and containing the same cast of voice actors, adapts the After Story arc from the Clannad visual novel, which is a continuation of Nagisa's scenario. Clannad After Story has 25 episodes, 24 of which aired in Japan between October 2008 and March 2009. The last episode was again released as an OVA on the eighth DVD in July 2009. The episodes were released on eight DVD compilation volumes between December 2008 and July 2009. Sentai Filmworks also licensed Clannad After Story and Section23 Films localized and distributed the television series and OVA starting with the first half season box set with English subtitles released in October 2009. The second half season box set containing the remaining episodes was released in December 2009. Sentai Filmworks re-released Clannad After Story with an English dub on April 19, 2011.

Aside from the theme music used for the episodes, the rest of the soundtrack for both anime series is sampled from several albums released for the Clannad visual novel including the Clannad Original Soundtrack, Mabinogi, -Memento-, Sorarado, and Sorarado Append. The cover art for Sorarado Append is also visible as the last shot in the ending video animation of the first season. This includes four insert songs used within the first season's episodes which include:  and "Ana" used in episode nine,  used in episode 18, and  used in episode 22 which is also the main ending theme from the visual novel.

Clannad
Of the 24 episodes planned for release by Kyoto Animation, 23 were aired on television with the first 22 being regular episodes, followed by an additional extra episode. The last episode was released as an original video animation on the eighth DVD on July 16, 2008, and is set in an alternate universe from the anime series in which Tomoya and Tomoyo are dating. The OVA episode was previewed on May 31, 2008, for an audience of four-hundred people picked via a mail-in postcard campaign. The broadcast time was first announced on August 11, 2007, at the TBS festival Anime Festa, which is also when the first episode was showcased. The episodes aired between October 4, 2007, and March 27, 2008, on the TBS Japanese television network in 4:3 aspect ratio. The anime also aired in 16:9 aspect ratio between October 26, 2007, and April 4, 2008, on the BS-i Japanese television network. The anime series was released in a set of eight DVD compilations in Japan released between December 19, 2007, and July 16, 2008, by Pony Canyon, with each compilation containing three episodes. A Blu-ray Disc box set of Clannad was released on April 30, 2010, in Japan.

The license holding company Sentai Filmworks licensed the Clannad anime series, and Section23 Films localized and distributed the television series and the OVA starting with the first half-season box set consisting of 12 episodes with English subtitles, Japanese audio, and no English language track, which was released on March 3, 2009. The second half season box set containing the remaining episodes was released on May 5, 2009. A complete box set of Clannad was released on June 15, 2010, featuring a new English dub of the series.

Two pieces of theme music are used for the episodes: one opening theme and one ending theme.

Clannad After Story
A continuation of the first anime series titled Clannad After Story produced by the same staff as with the first series, and containing the same cast of voice actors, adapts the After Story arc from the Clannad visual novel, which is a continuation of Nagisa's scenario. The second season aired in Japan between October 3, 2008, and March 26, 2009, on TBS in 4:3 aspect ratio with 24 episodes. Of the 24 episodes, 22 are regular episodes, the 23 is an extra episode, and the last episode is a summary episode showcasing highlights from the series. Clannad After Story also aired in 16:9 aspect ratio starting on October 24, 2008. The episodes were released on eight DVD compilation volumes between December 3, 2008, and July 1, 2009. The eighth DVD volume came with an additional original video animation (OVA) episode set in an alternate universe from the anime series where Tomoya and Kyou are dating. The OVA episode was previewed on May 24, 2009, for a limited number of people.

The license holding company Sentai Filmworks licensed the Clannad After Story anime series, and Section23 Films localized and distributed the television series and the OVA starting with the first half season box set consisting of 12 episodes with English subtitles, Japanese audio, and no English language track, released on October 20, 2009. The second half season box set containing the remaining episodes was released on December 8, 2009. Sentai Filmworks re-released Clannad After Story with an English dub in April 2011.

Two pieces of theme music are used for the episodes; one opening theme and one ending theme. The ending theme is "Torch", and both the opening and ending themes are sung by Lia.

References

External links
Official Clannad anime website 
Official Clannad After Story anime website 

Episodes
Clannad